Donald Peterson may refer to:

 Donald H. Peterson (1933–2018), United States Air Force officer and astronaut
 Donald R. Peterson (1923–2007), professor of psychology at Rutgers University
 C. Donald Peterson (1918–1987), American jurist and politician
 Don Peterson, American business executive
 Don Peterson (American football) (1928–2010), American football player

See also
 Donald Paterson (disambiguation)